Pierre-Loup Bouquet (born 24 March 1987) is a French former competitive ice dancer. With Zoé Blanc, he is a three-time French national medalist and placed 14th at the 2010 European Championships. They retired from competition in 2011. Bouquet has worked as a choreographer.

Programs 
(with Blanc)

Results 
(with Blanc)

References

External links 

 

1987 births
Living people
French male ice dancers
Sportspeople from Pas-de-Calais
Competitors at the 2009 Winter Universiade
Competitors at the 2011 Winter Universiade